Euphemia Mary Goldsborough Willson (June 5, 1836 – March 10, 1896) was a nurse.

Biography 
Willson was born at her family's plantation, “Boston,” in Maryland, the first of eight children to Martin Goldsborough and Ann Hayward Goldsborough. In the 1850s, she was sent to a girl's boarding school in Tallahassee, Florida. By the advent of the American Civil War, she had joined her family in Baltimore at 49 Courtland Street. The house would become a refuge for confederate soldiers and blockade runners. At the Battle of Antietam, Willson and several other women traveled to the battlefront to nurse wounded soldiers. The nursing was enough of a success that she traveled to Point Lookout, a confederate prison, where she nursed soldiers. Again, at the Battle of Gettysburg, she nursed hundreds of wounded troops. After the death of Sam Watson, who it is thought that Willson loved; she moved back to Baltimore. Willson was soon indicted of treason, and banished from the Union, and sent to Richmond, Virginia, arriving on December 4, 1863.

She was received in Richmond very well; and Jefferson Davis ensured that she got a job with the Treasury. Willson soon returned to nursing, and was outside of the city when it was evacuated. On June 29, 1874, at the age of 38, Willson married Charles Perry Willson, a former Confederate soldier. The couple moved to Summit Point, West Virginia, and played a large role in building the local church, by some estimates raising one-third of the funds needed. She died on March 10, 1896, of cancer.

References

1836 births
1896 deaths
American Civil War nurses
American women nurses
People of Maryland in the American Civil War
Goldsborough family
People from Jefferson County, West Virginia